Alexander Sagadin (born 12 June 1915, date of death unknown) was an Austrian equestrian. He competed in the individual dressage event at the 1956 Summer Olympics.

References

1915 births
Year of death missing
Austrian male equestrians
Austrian dressage riders
Olympic equestrians of Austria
Equestrians at the 1956 Summer Olympics
Place of birth missing